Plinia rogersiana is a species of plant in the family Myrtaceae. It is endemic to the state of São Paulo in the south-east of Brazil. It is considered critically endangered, possibly extinct.

References

rogersiana
Crops originating from the Americas
Crops originating from Brazil
Tropical fruit
Endemic flora of Brazil
Fruits originating in South America
Cauliflory
Fruit trees
Berries
Critically endangered species
Critically endangered plants
Critically endangered biota of South America
Plants described in 1995